William Arthur Land was an English track and field athlete.

Athletics career
Land was the 1932 high jump AAA champion  He competed in the discus throw and high jump at the 1934 British Empire Games. Land also held the British javelin throw record in 1935.

References

English male high jumpers
Athletes (track and field) at the 1934 British Empire Games
English male discus throwers
English male javelin throwers
Commonwealth Games competitors for England